Bonal, is a village in the southern state of Karnataka, India. Administratively, Bonal is under Aldal gram panchayat, Shorapur Taluka of Yadgir District in Karnataka.  The village of Bonal is 6 km by road east-southeast of the village of Wagingera and 4 km by road west-northwest of the village of Chikanhalli.  The nearest railhead is in Yadgir.

The Bonal Bird Sanctuary is located about a kilometer north of the village.

Demographics 
At the 2001 census, Bonal had 1,928 inhabitants, with 970 males and 958 females.

Notes

External links 
 

Villages in Yadgir district